Spring Creek Township is a township in Coffey County, Kansas, United States. As of the 2000 census, its population was 118.

Geography
According to the USGS, it contains three cemeteries: Logue, Stoeltzing and Wooster.

The streams of Bowmans Branch and Loss Creek run through this township.

References
 USGS Geographic Names Information System (GNIS)

External links
 US-Counties.com
 City-Data.com

Townships in Coffey County, Kansas
Townships in Kansas